Clarence Wishaw Moberly (1838–1902) was a Canadian civil engineer.

Born at Penetanguishene, Ontario, he was the son of Capt. John Moberly. His brothers Walter and Frank were also civil engineers.
 
Moberly was for many years chief engineer of the Northern Railway of Canada, from Toronto to Collingwood. From 1868 he was a director of the Rama Timber Transport Company. He resigned from the Northern Railway in 1875, to become the contractor of the Northern Extensions Railway to Gravenhurst. Following its completion later that year, he became chief engineer of James David Edgar's Ontario & Pacific Junction Railway, and proposed to build a connection from there to the proposed Canadian Pacific Railway. The O & P J was never built.

Moberly died in Collingwood in 1902.

1838 births
1902 deaths
Canadian civil engineers
People from Penetanguishene